I Remember may refer to:

 Je me souviens, the motto of Quebec, Canada, which translates to "I remember"
 I Remember (book), a 1970 memoir by Joe Brainard

Music

Albums
 I Remember (AlunaGeorge album), a 2016 album by AlunaGeorge
 I Remember (Meli'sa Morgan album), a 2005 album by Meli'sa Morgan
 I Remember (Shin album), a 2012 album by Shin

Songs
 "I Remember" (The Badloves song), from Get On Board
 "I Remember" (Bang Yong-guk and Yang Yo-seob song)
 "I Remember" (Keyshia Cole song), from Just like You
 "I Remember" (deadmau5 and Kaskade song), from Random Album Title and Strobelite Seduction
 "I Remember", by A Day to Remember from Common Courtesy
 "I Remember", by Betty Who from Betty
 "I Remember", by Coolio from It Takes a Thief
 "I Remember", by Eddie Cochran, B-side from the single "Teenage Heaven"
 "I Remember", by Kelly Rowland from Talk a Good Game
 "I Remember", by Maurice Williams & The Zodiacs from Stay with Maurice Williams & The Zodiacs
 "I Remember", by Stabbing Westward from Stabbing Westward
 "I Remember", by The Urge from Receiving the Gift of Flavor
 "I Remember", by Stephen Sondheim from the musical Evening Primrose
 "I Remember", a single by Eminem

See also
 I Remember Better When I Paint, a documentary film
 "I Remember Elvis Presley (The King Is Dead)", a song by Danny Mirror
 I Remember You (disambiguation)
 "I Will Remember", a song by Toto
 I Will Remember You (disambiguation)
 "I'll Remember", a song by Madonna
 "In the Still of the Nite (I'll Remember)", a version of the song, "In the Still of the Nite" by The Five Satins, recorded by Boyz II Men
 Remember (disambiguation)